Enos Throop Hotchkiss (March 29, 1832 – January 20, 1900) was credited as being the founder of both Lake City, Colorado and Hotchkiss, Colorado. He is buried in Riverside Cemetery, Hotchkiss Colorado. He had nine kids and two wives.

References

1832 births
1900 deaths
People from Hinsdale County, Colorado
People from Delta County, Colorado